Nicaragua competed at the 2011 Pan American Games in Guadalajara, Mexico from October 14 to 30, 2011. Nicaragua's contingent was made up of 50 people including 31 athletes competing in 11 different sports. The Chef de mission of the team was Eduardo Abdullah.

Athletics

Men
Track and road events

Women
Track and road events

Field events

Basque pelota

Nicaragua qualified two athletes in the paleta rubber pairs 30m fronton category.

Men

Beach volleyball

Nicaragua qualified a men's and women's team in the beach volleyball competition.

Boxing

Nicaragua qualified a boxing team of four athletes.

Men

Women

Rowing

Men

Women

Shooting

Men

Swimming

Nicaragua qualified three swimmers.

Men

Women

Taekwondo

Nicaragua received a wild card to send one male taekwondo athlete.

Men

Triathlon

Nicaragua received a wild card in the men's triathlon event.

Men

Weightlifting

Nicaragua qualified one male athlete and one female athlete.

Wrestling

Nicaragua qualified one athlete in the 55 kg men's Greco-Roman category.

Men
Greco-Roman

References

Nations at the 2011 Pan American Games
P
2011